Arragonia tunesiella is a moth in the family Autostichidae. It was described by Hans Georg Amsel in 1942. It is found in Tunisia.

References

Moths described in 1942
Holcopogoninae